HCRP may refer to:

 Hardcopy Cable Replacement Profile, Bluetooth
 Historic Cairo Restoration Project, Egypt